The Polk County Courthouse in Osceola, Nebraska is a Beaux Arts-style building designed by architect William F. Gernandt.  It was built in 1921-22 and is located on the Courthouse Square in Osceola.  It was listed on the National Register of Historic Places in 1990.

Its National Register nomination describes it as "a tour de force of classically inspired ornamentation rendered in creamcolored terra cotta and contrasting tan-grey brick. A variety of rich classical detail, immense columns, pronounced cornice, and rusticated basement are hallmarks of the Beaux Arts Style exhibited on the building. In particular, the terra cotta detail is a visual delight. Acroteria and rosettes march along the top of the projecting cornice, with consoles in an acanthus pattern and an egg-and-dart course below. Shields, della
Robbia wreaths, swags, and geometric patterns further adorn the facade."

References

External links

Courthouses in Nebraska
National Register of Historic Places in Polk County, Nebraska
Beaux-Arts architecture in Nebraska
Government buildings completed in 1921